Joliette is a regional county municipality in the Lanaudière region of Quebec, Canada. Its seat is Joliette.

The municipality has a land area of 417.41 km2 and its 2021 census population of 71,124 inhabitants.

Subdivisions
There are 10 subdivisions within the RCM:

Cities & Towns (3)
 Joliette
 Notre-Dame-des-Prairies
 Saint-Charles-Borromée

Municipalities (6)
 Crabtree
 Notre-Dame-de-Lourdes
 Saint-Ambroise-de-Kildare
 Sainte-Mélanie
 Saint-Paul
 Saint-Thomas

Villages (1)
 Saint-Pierre

Transportation

Access Routes
Highways and numbered routes that run through the municipality, including external routes that start or finish at the county border:

 Autoroutes
 

 Principal Highways
 
 

 Secondary Highways
 
 
 

 External Routes
 None

See also
 List of regional county municipalities and equivalent territories in Quebec

References

Regional county municipalities in Lanaudière
Census divisions of Quebec
Joliette